Acoustic suspension (air suspension, closed box, sealed box) is a method of loudspeaker cabinet design and utilisation that uses one or more loudspeaker drivers mounted in a sealed box or cabinet. Acoustic suspension systems reduce bass distortion that can be caused by stiff motor suspensions in conventional loudspeakers.

A compact acoustic suspension loudspeaker was described in 1954 by Edgar Villchur, and it was brought to commercial production by Villchur and Henry Kloss with the founding of Acoustic Research in Cambridge, Massachusetts. In 1960, Villchur reiterated that: The first aim of the acoustic suspension design, over and above uniformity of frequency response, compactness, and extension of response into the low-bass range, is to reduce significantly the level of bass distortion that had previously been tolerated in loudspeakers. This is accomplished by substituting an air-spring for a mechanical one. Subsequently, the theory of closed-box loudspeakers was extensively described by Small.

Speaker cabinets with acoustic suspension can provide well-controlled bass response, especially in comparison with an equivalently-sized speaker enclosure that has a bass reflex port or vent. The bass vent boosts low-frequency output, but with the tradeoff of introducing phase delay and accuracy problems in reproducing transient signals. Sealed boxes are generally less efficient than a bass-reflex cabinet for the same low-frequency cut-off and cabinet volume, so a sealed-box speaker cabinet will need more electrical power to deliver the same amount of acoustic low-frequency bass output.

Theory

The acoustic suspension woofer uses the elastic cushion of air within a sealed enclosure to provide the restoring force for the woofer diaphragm. The cushion of air acts like a compression spring. Because the air in the cabinet serves to control the woofer's excursion, the physical stiffness of the driver can be reduced. Unlike the stiff physical suspension built into the driver of conventional speakers, the trapped air inside the sealed-loudspeaker enclosure provides a more linear restoring force for the woofer's diaphragm, enabling it to oscillate a greater distance (excursion) in a linear fashion. This is a requirement for low distortion and loud reproduction of deep bass by drivers with relatively small cones.

Even though acoustic suspension cabinets are often called "sealed box" designs, they are not entirely airtight. A small amount of airflow must be allowed so that the speaker can adjust to changes in atmospheric pressure. A semi-porous cone surround allows enough air movement for this purpose. Most Acoustic Research designs used a PVA sealer on the foam surrounds to enable a longer component life and enhance performance. The venting was via the cloth spider and cloth dust caps, and not so much through the cone surround.

Acoustic suspension woofers remain popular in hi-fi systems due to their low distortion. They also have lower group delay at low frequencies compared to bass reflex designs, resulting in better transient response. However, the audibility of this benefit is somewhat contested. As noted by Small, an analysis performed by Thiele suggested that the differences among correctly adjusted systems of both types are likely to be inaudible.

In the 2000s, most subwoofers, bass amplifier cabinets and sound reinforcement system speaker cabinets use bass reflex ports, rather than a sealed-box design, in order to obtain more extended low-frequency response and to get higher sound pressure level (SPL). The speaker enclosure designers and their customers view the risk of increased distortion and phase delay as an acceptable price to pay for increased bass output and higher maximum SPL. That said, if one is designing a sound system for a style of music where very accurate, precise bass rhythms are an important part of the genre, one may wish to consider the merits of sealed box woofers and subwoofers.

Acoustic performance

The two most common types of speaker enclosure are acoustic suspension (sometimes called pneumatic suspension) and bass reflex, so they are worth comparing. In both cases, the tuning affects the lower end of the driver's response, but above a certain frequency, the driver itself becomes the dominant factor and the size of the enclosure and ports (if any) become irrelevant.

In general, acoustic suspension systems (driver plus enclosure) have a second-order acoustic (12 dB/octave) roll-off below the −3 dB point. Bass reflex designs have a fourth-order acoustic roll-off (24 dB/octave). Given a driver that is suitable for either type of enclosure, the ideal bass reflex cabinet will be larger, have a lower −3 dB point, but both systems will have equal voltage sensitivity in the passband.

On the right is a simulation of the low-frequency response of a typical 5" mid-woofer, the FaitalPRO 5FE120 mid-woofer generated, obtained using WinISD, for ideal sealed (yellow) and ported (cyan) enclosure configurations. The ported version adds about an octave of bass extension, dropping the −3 dB point from 100 Hz to 50 Hz, but the tradeoff is that the cabinet size is more than twice as large, 8 litres of interior space versus 3.8 litres. It is also worth noting that: a) above 200 Hz the simulations converge and there is no difference in output, and b) below 32 Hz the sealed enclosure produces more low-frequency output. Thus, a ported cabinet does not provide improved bass output over the entire low-frequency range.

Small presented the physical efficiency-bandwidth-volume limitation of closed-box system design. By considering the variation in the reference efficiency of the driver operating in the system enclosure, the relationship of maximum reference efficiency to cut-off frequency and enclosure volume for closed-box loudspeaker systems was determined. Subsequently, Small derived a similar relationship for vented-box loudspeaker systems. When Small compared these two sets of results, they revealed that the closed-box system has a maximum theoretical value of reference efficiency that is 2.9 dB lower than that of the vented-box system. This suggests that an acoustic suspension loudspeaker with the same enclosure volume and low-frequency −3 dB cut-off as a vented-box system will be up to 2.9 dB less sensitive than its counterpart. Alternatively, if the reference efficiency and cut-off frequency of the two systems is the same, then the enclosure volume of the acoustic suspension loudspeaker will be approximately twice as large as that of the vented system.

The acoustic roll-off of acoustic suspension designs makes them easier to integrate with other drivers with a crossover (passive or active). This makes it an ideal choice for midrange enclosures as well as for satellite speaker and subwoofer systems .

In multi-way speakers

While boxed hi-fi speakers are often described as being acoustic suspension or ported (bass reflex), depending on the absence or presence of a port tube/vent, it is also true that, in typical box speakers with more than two drivers, the midrange drivers between the woofer and tweeter are usually designed as acoustic suspension, with a separate, sealed air-space, even if the woofer itself is not. However, one notable exception to this was the Sonus Faber Stradivari Homage, which used a ported enclosure for the midrange.

See also
 Bass reflex – a type of loudspeaker enclosure that uses a port (hole) or vent cut into the cabinet and a section of tubing or pipe affixed to the port.
 Loudspeaker enclosure
 Passive radiator (speaker)
 Transmission line loudspeaker

References

Acoustics
Loudspeaker technology